The Michigan Walk of Fame, styled on the famous Hollywood Walk of Fame, honors Michigan residents, past or present, who have made significant contributions to the state or nation.

Located along central Lansing's Washington Square, it aimed to be the first comprehensive Walk of Fame in the nation to honor the contributions of its residents on a statewide basis. Nominations were accepted from people around the state and nation.

The first group of Michigan Walk of Fame's inductees were honored on May 25, 2006, during Michigan Week. The 2006 inductees were announced on March 14  Stevie Wonder, Helen Thomas, Jeff Daniels, Dick Ford (Gerald Ford's brother), and many others attended the May 25 event to be formally inducted.  The intent was for twelve to be added annually.

The second group of inductees was announced in fall 2007.  The Walk of Fame was discontinued after 2007.

2006 Inductees 
Actor Jeff Daniels
Herbert Henry Dow, founder of Dow Chemical
Inventor Thomas Edison
President Gerald R. Ford 
Automotive pioneer Henry Ford
Emma Genevieve Gillette, the "mother" of the Michigan State Parks system
Sportscaster Ernie Harwell
W.K. Kellogg, founder of Kellogg's
Civil rights activist Rosa Parks
Fannie Richards, A pioneer African-American public school teacher in Detroit and the city's first kindergarten teacher.
Political Journalist Helen Thomas
Musician & Composer Stevie Wonder

2007 Inductees 
Boxer, Joe Louis Barrow
Educator and linguist, Mack-e-te-be-nessy/Andrew Blackbird
Automotive pioneer, William C. Durant
Mr. Hockey Gordie Howe
Dr. Pearl Kendrick and Dr. Grace Eldering, who created a vaccine for Whooping Cough
Inventor, Elijah McCoy
Labor Union Leader, Walter Reuther
Eero Saarinen, famed architect and designer of the St. Louis Arch
Jonas Salk, who created the vaccine for polio
Mary Spencer, Michigan's first state librarian
Actor and philanthropist, Danny Thomas/Muzyad Yahkoob

References

External links
 MI Walk of Fame Announces First Inductees  3/14/2006 (visited March 15, 2006
 List of Stars with texts of the plaques

Culture of Lansing, Michigan
Walks of fame
Halls of fame in Michigan
State halls of fame in the United States
Tourist attractions in Lansing, Michigan
2006 establishments in Michigan